The God Particle is the third EP by Shpongle, released on 1 February 2011. Both tracks on the EP feature Benji Vaughan of Younger Brother. The EP was inspired by the Large Hadron Collider in Switzerland.

Track listing
 "Before The Big Bang" – 6:23
 "The God Particle" – 10:43

The title of the first track was misspelled as "Berfore The Big Bang" on the CD version.

References

Shpongle albums
2011 EPs